Waxwork Records is an American independent record label. It has released film scores and movie soundtracks on vinyl as well as comics.

History 
 
Waxwork Records was founded in 2013 by Kevin Bergeron and Sue Ellen Soto. By 2015, it had re-released vinyl scores for horror films such as Day of the Dead, Creepshow, and Chopping Mall. It also released a blood-filled vinyl collection for Harry Manfredini's Friday the 13th soundtrack. In 2016, it released House of Waxwork, the first comic book from its Waxwork Comics line.

References

External links 
 
 
Record labels established in 2013